Armada is a village in Macomb County in the U.S. state of Michigan. The population was 1,684 at the 2020 census. The village is located within Armada Township.  It is best known for its annual Armada Fair.

History

The first record of land purchased in the area that became Armada Township was made by John Proctor in 1825.  Twenty-three more families had bought land in the rural area by 1832.  Until 1832 the area was part of Ray Township.  At that time a meeting was called to organize a separate township.  The vote won by two and Armada Township was founded. When the discussion began to choose the name for the new township, legend says that "Hosea Northrup jumped up and shouted the name 'Armada'".  The name was accepted.
 
Several communities were founded within the township, which was originally developed for agriculture. What became the village of Armada was founded in 1833 by Elijah Burke; it was originally called Burke's Corners after him. The village began to prosper when residents improved the old Indian trail for use as a roadway in the early 1830s. The road soon became part of the immigrant and migrant road network between Romeo and Port Huron, Michigan. Today this is known as Armada Ridge Road.
 
Burke's Corners was briefly renamed Honeoye, for the New York hometown of several newly arrived migrants.  When the village was finally incorporated in the late 1860s, it was officially named Armada, the same as the township. By then the village had about 800 inhabitants.
 
During the late nineteenth and early twentieth centuries, the village had a stagecoach stop, an opera house, a theater, seven grocery stores, three hotels, three hardware stores, a lumberyard, a grain mill, two implement dealers, a bakery, five doctors, several blacksmiths shops, and a drug store.  
 
The first school in Armada was a one-room schoolhouse located at Selleck's Corners. Soon schools were built all around the township. These one-room schools were consolidated during the 1940s. At that time, children were bused into town to attend the schools of the consolidated district.
 
Armada's interest in education was demonstrated in the early 20th century by their applying to the Carnegie Foundation for matching funds in order to build and operate a public library.  Andrew Carnegie's program was based on providing grants to villages and towns that would both provide matching funds for construction and commit to supporting all operations and maintenance of libraries. The residents committee of the township asked for $8,000 toward building a permanent township library.  The Armada Free Public Library was built in 1915 and is still being used to provide library service in the early 21st century.   
 
A number of fraternal organizations, a literary club, a science club, and the Armada Cornet Band were among the social outlets for villagers and township residents. 
 
The Michigan Air-Line Railroad connected Armada to other cities in Michigan and elsewhere.  Passengers and freight were processed through the two-door depot at the foot of Church Street.  A cartage company delivered the freight to uptown businesses by horse and wagon.

In 2014, the village was shut down due to an investigation by Michigan State Police and the FBI of the murder of 14-year-old April Millsap, who was walking her dog on the Macomb Orchard Trail. Her body was found just outside the city limits. In 2016 a jury found the 34-year-old defendant, James VanCallis, a man from St. Clair County, to be guilty of four counts associated with the murder. He was sentenced to life in prison. 

Following this, residents came together to support their community. In a July 2019 Reader's Digest vote, Armada was selected as the "Nicest Place in Michigan."  It was a finalist for the magazine's "50 Nicest Places in America" story.

Geography

Demographics

2010 census
As of the census of 2010, there were 1,730 people, 607 households, and 425 families residing in the village. The racial makeup of the village was 98.0% White, 0.3% African American, 0.1% Native American, 0.1% Asian, 0.1% Pacific Islander, 0.4% from other races, and 0.9% from two or more races. Hispanic or Latino of any race were 2.6% of the population.

There were 607 households, of which 40.2% had children under the age of 18 living with them, 55.7% were married couples living together, 10.7% had a female householder with no husband present, 3.6% had a male householder with no wife present, and 30.0% were non-families. 25.7% of all households were made up of individuals, and 11.9% had someone living alone who was 65 years of age or older. The average household size was 2.73 and the average family size was 3.30.

The median age in the village was 38.6 years. 27.9% of residents were under the age of 18; 8.3% were between the ages of 18 and 24; 24% were from 25 to 44; 24.8% were from 45 to 64; and 15.1% were 65 years of age or older. The gender makeup of the village was 47.3% male and 52.7% female.

2000 census
As of the census of 2000, there were 1,573 people, 540 households, and 408 families residing in the village. The racial makeup of the village was 97.71% White, 0.19% African American, 0.57% Native American, 0.13% Asian, 0.06% Pacific Islander, 0.19% from other races, and 1.14% from two or more races. Hispanic or Latino of any race were 1.65% of the population.

There were 540 households, out of which 42.2% had children under the age of 18 living with them, 63.3% were married couples living together, 8.0% had a female householder with no husband present, and 24.4% were non-families. 21.3% of all households were made up of individuals, and 7.6% had someone living alone who was 65 years of age or older.  The average household size was 2.81 and the average family size was 3.29.

In the village, the population dispersal was 29.2% under the age of 18, 7.8% from 18 to 24, 30.8% from 25 to 44, 21.3% from 45 to 64, and 10.9% who were 65 years of age or older.  The median age was 34 years. For every 100 females, there were 90.0 males.  For every 100 females age 18 and over, there were 90.4 males.

The median income for a household in the village was $61,700, and the median income for a family was $69,917. Males had a median income of $50,795 versus $32,330 for females. The per capita income for the village was $22,446. About 2.9% of families and 3.6% of the population were below the poverty line, including 3.8% of those under age 18 and 6.5% of those age 65 or over.

Attractions 
A country fair has been held in the village each August since 1872.

A Halloween festival, Armada-geddon, is held in the village each year on the first Saturday in October. It celebrates the fall, fun, and all things spooky.  The event includes a 5k-walk, run and shamble; a street fair with craft vendors and food, games for the kids and, in the evening, a lighted Halloween Parade.

Notable people 

 Dick Enberg, sports announcer; attended high school in Armada
 Martha Griffiths, 59th Lieutenant Governor of Michigan; lived and died in Armada

References

External links

 Village of Armada Official Site
 Armada Fair website
 Armada Chamber of Commerce
 NEMC-TV6: Armada Area Public-access television cable TV website
 Armada-geddon Armada's Annual Halloween Festival 

Villages in Macomb County, Michigan
Villages in Michigan
Populated places established in 1833
1833 establishments in Michigan Territory